Ranina Reddy is an Indian playback singer. She has sung mainly in Tamil and Telugu for various music composers including Yuvan Shankar Raja, Harris Jayaraj, Devi sri Prasad, Sai Thaman, Selva Ganesh, Raghu Dixit, and S.A. Rajkumar.

Career
Reddy appeared in Venkat Prabhu's 2008 comedy thriller Saroja. She has since performed several songs, most notably for Harris Jayaraj.

Discography

Soundtrack

References

Living people
Indian women playback singers
Bollywood playback singers
Tamil playback singers
Telugu playback singers
Year of birth missing (living people)
Malayalam playback singers
Singers from Bangalore
Film musicians from Karnataka
21st-century Indian singers
21st-century Indian women singers
Women musicians from Karnataka